Lee Won-Kyu is a South Korean football player, who last played for K-League side Busan I'Park as a defender.

Club career

Lee joined Busan I'Park as a draft pick from Yonsei University.  Lee made his professional debut in the first round of the 2011 K-League, against Jeju United. The following week, against Sangju Sangmu FC in a tightly contested match, Lee scored his first goal in extra time which ensured a 3 - 3 draw for Busan.

Club career statistics

References

External links

1988 births
Living people
Association football defenders
South Korean footballers
Busan IPark players
K League 1 players
Yonsei University alumni